Ribnica is a suburban settlement of city of Kraljevo in central Serbia. It is situated on the right side of the river Ibar and on the left side of the river Ribnica just near its confluence with the river Ibar. The population of Ribnica was 1,624 people in 2011.

References

Populated places in Raška District
Kraljevo